Sergio Silva (died 26 August 2000) was a Uruguayan footballer who played professionally in Mexico, United States and Uruguay.

Career
Silva began playing football as a central forward in the Uruguayan Primera División. He played for C.A. Cerro and participated in the United Soccer Association with his Cerro teammates under the New York Skyliners franchise in 1967.

In 1970, Silva moved to Mexico, where he would spend the remainder of his playing career. He initially signed with Mexican Primera División side Deportivo Toluca, but joined Torreón in 1972. He moved to San Luis for the 1976–77 season and played for Tampico the next season after Tampico acquired San Luis' franchise.

Silva appeared in two 1970 FIFA World Cup qualifying matches for the Uruguay national football team during 1969.

Personal
Silva's sons, Marcelo Silva Rigau and Sergio Silva Rigau, are a football manager and a professional football referee.

References

2000 deaths
Uruguayan footballers
Uruguay international footballers
Uruguayan expatriate footballers
Liga MX players
C.A. Cerro players
Deportivo Toluca F.C. players
San Luis F.C. players
Expatriate soccer players in the United States
Expatriate footballers in Mexico
Year of birth missing
Association football forwards